Moses Lycurgus Broocks (November 1, 1864 – May 27, 1908) was a U.S. Representative from Texas.

Born near San Augustine, Texas, Broocks attended the common schools.
He was graduated from the law department of the University of Texas at Austin in 1891 and commenced practice at San Augustine.
He served as member of the State house of representatives in 1892.
He moved to Beaumont, Texas.

Broocks was elected district attorney of the first judicial district of Texas in 1896 and served one term.

Broocks was elected as a Democrat to the Fifty-ninth Congress (March 4, 1905 – March 3, 1907).
He resumed the practice of law in San Augustine, Texas, and died there May 27, 1908.
He was interred in Old Broocks Cemetery, about four miles east of San Augustine, Texas.

Sources

1864 births
1908 deaths
People from San Augustine County, Texas
Democratic Party members of the United States House of Representatives from Texas
19th-century American politicians
University of Texas at Austin alumni